Vandana Luthra (born July 12, 1959) is an Indian entrepreneur and the founder of VLCC Health Care Ltd, a beauty and wellness conglomerate represented in Asia, the GCC and Africa. She is also the chairperson of the Beauty & Wellness Sector Skill Council (B&WSSC), an initiative that provides training under the Pradhan Mantri Kaushal Vikas Yojana schemes.

She was appointed the first chairperson of the Beauty and Wellness Sector Skill Council in 2014. This is backed by the government of India and offers skills training for the beauty industry.

Early life and education
Vandana Luthra was born in New Delhi in 1959. Her father was a mechanical engineer and her mother was an ayurvedic doctor who was running a charitable initiative - Amar Jyoti. This motivated her to impact people's lives, and hence, after completing her graduation from the Polytechnic for Women in New Delhi she went to Europe to gain expertise in beauty, food and nutrition and skin care.

VLCC(Vandana Luthra Curls and Curves)
Luthra started VLCC in 1989, as a beauty and  wellness service center in Safdarjung Development Area, New Delhi that focused on dietary modification and exercise regimen-based weight management programs . VLCC has a strong national and international presence. It offers weight management and beauty programs (skin, body and haircare treatments and advanced dermatology and cosmetology solutions).

VLCC has the largest scale and breadth of operations within the beauty and wellness services industry in India. Currently the store operates in 326 locations in 153 cities and 13 countries in South Asia, South East Asia, the GCC Region and East Africa. With over 4,000 employees, including nutrition counsellors, medical professionals, physiotherapists, cosmetologists and beauty professionals, VLCC is a leader in the Indian beauty and wellness industry by market share.

The company operates its products business through its subsidiary, VLCC Personal Care Limited in India and GVig in Singapore third party manufacture, which it acquired in September 2013. Presently, its GMP-certified manufacturing plants are situated at Haridwar, India and Singapore. The company manufactures and markets 170 hair care, skin care and body care products along with functional and fortified foods that are consumed in-house (in treatments and therapies at VLCC Wellness Centers). These products are also sold through 100,000 outlets in India, over 10,000 outlets across the GCC region and South East Asia and through e-commerce channels.

VLCC also operates vocational training institutes called the VLCC Institute of Beauty & Nutrition that have grown to become India’s largest chain of vocational education academies in the beauty and nutrition training segment after Mrs. Luthra become chairperson at BWSSC, with 73 campuses in 55 cities across India and one in Nepal. The institutes train nearly 10,000 students annually and offer courses in multiple disciplines.

Philanthropy

Luthra is Vice Chairperson of the NGO, Khushii, which has projects like telemedicine centers, a remedial school with midday meal facility catering to 3,000 children, and a vocational training facility. She is a member of Morarji Desai National Institute of Yoga and of the Steering Committee and the Sub-Committee formed by India’s Ministry of Skill Development & Entrepreneurship on the Pradhan Mantri Kaushal Vikas Yojana.

She is a patron of the Amar Jyoti Charitable Trust, which pioneered the concept of educating children with and without disability in equal number from nursery to class VIII. The Trust now has over 800 in children in its two schools.

Awards and recognitions
Luthra has received a host of awards for excellence and entrepreneurship over the years including the Padma Shri (India’s fourth highest civilian honor) in 2013 for her contribution to trade and industry. Other awards include:

The Asian Business Leaders Forum Trailblazer Award in 2012
The Enterprise Asia Women Entrepreneur of the Year Award in 2010
 Luthra was ranked 26th in the distinguished annual Forbes Asia 2016 list of 50 Power Businesswomen in the APAC region (which includes Asia, Australia and New Zealand). Of the 50 women achievers featured, only 8 were from India. 
 She has featured in Fortune magazine's annual listing of the ‘50 Most Powerful Women in Business in India’ for five years in a row – from 2011 to 2015.

Publications
Vandana Luthra has authored two books, Complete Fitness Program and A Good Life, on wellness and fitness.

References

1959 births
Living people
Recipients of the Padma Shri in trade and industry
Businesswomen from Delhi
Businesspeople from Delhi
Indian women company founders
Indian company founders